Daniel Armer Kelly (March 19, 1841 - January 18, 1912) was an American soldier who fought in the American Civil War. Kelly received his country's highest award for bravery during combat, the Medal of Honor. Kelly's medal was won for his extraordinary heroism during the Battle of Waynesboro, in Virginia on March 2, 1865. He was honored with the award on March 26, 1865.

Kelly was born in Groveland, New York. He joined the Army in August 1862, and mustered out with his regiment in June 1865. Kelly was buried in Reading, Michigan.

Medal of Honor citation

See also
List of American Civil War Medal of Honor recipients: G–L

References

1841 births
1912 deaths
American Civil War recipients of the Medal of Honor
People from Groveland, New York
People of New York (state) in the American Civil War
Union Army officers
United States Army Medal of Honor recipients